Till Death Do Us Party is the debut studio album from American singer-songwriter and drag queen, Adore Delano. The album was released through Sidecar Records in association with Producer Entertainment Group on June 3, 2014. The album was available to pre-order on May 29, 2014, and was officially released on June 3, 2014. In November 2014, Delano announced that she was working on a follow-up to Till Death Do Us Party.

Promotion 
In conjunction with the album, Adore appeared in an 11-episode web series, Let the Music Play, produced by World of Wonder. Each webisode details a track off of the album.

Delano has been on her worldwide "Till Death Do Us Party Tour" since shortly after the release of the album and also joined other Drag Race alum on the Battle of the Seasons Tour.

Critical reception 

The album received generally positive reviews from select critics. David Lim, writing for So So Gay, praised the album: "Till Death Do Us Party is not only an affirmation of Adore’s vocal and songwriting prowess – it also puts her forward as a strong candidate for the platinum-selling American pop sorority of Katy, Kesha, Miley and Gaga." Luis Gonzalez of AlbumConfessions wrote, "Till Death Do Us Party is a project which easily exceeds initial expectations. While most former contestant's from RuPaul's Drag Race tend to release generic material void of any vocal merit, Adore Delano proves her time on American Idol was well deserved" in his four-star review.

Chart performance 
In the US, the album debuted at number 59 on the Billboard 200, number 3 on the Dance/Electronic Albums chart, and number 11 on the Independent Albums chart. It became the highest-charting album amongst her peers in RuPaul's Drag Race (including RuPaul's efforts).

Track listing

Charts

References 

2014 albums
Adore Delano albums
Dance music albums by American artists
Producer Entertainment Group albums